is the Japanese Shinto shrine at Hakata in Fukuoka Prefecture on the island of Kyushu.

History
Sumiyoshi was one of the chief Shinto shrines (ichinomiya) of the old Chikuzen Province.  It serves today as one of the ichinomiya of Fukuoka Prefecture.  The enshrined kami are:
 
 
 
Beppyo shrines

References

Other websites

Shinto shrines in Fukuoka Prefecture